Latifur Rahman is a Bangladesh Jamaat-e-Islami politician and a former Jatiya Sangsad member representing the Chapai Nawabganj-3 constituency.

Career
Ahmed was elected to parliament from Chapai Nawabganj-3 as a Bangladesh Jamaat-e-Islami candidate in 1986 and 1991. He was defeated by participating in the national elections of the 12 June 1996, 2001 and 2008 Bangladeshi general election as a Jamaat-e-Islami candidate.

References

Living people
Bangladesh Jamaat-e-Islami politicians
3rd Jatiya Sangsad members
5th Jatiya Sangsad members
Year of birth missing (living people)
Place of birth missing (living people)